Gulyás may refer to:

 Gulyás (herdsman), a Hungarian cattle-herdsman
 Goulash, a Hungarian soup or stew
 Gulyásleves, a Hungarian soup